The 2006 FIA GT Paul Ricard 500 km was the fifth race for the 2006 FIA GT Championship season.  The summer break is over It took place on August 20, 2006.

Official results

Class winners in bold.  Cars failing to complete 70% of winner's distance marked as Not Classified (NC).

Statistics
 Pole Position – #34 PSI Experience – 1:52.841
 Average Speed – 177.74 km/h

External links
 Official Results

P
FIA GT Paul
FIA GT Paul Ricard 500km